Brampton Gurdon (1606–1669), of Letton in Norfolk, was an English Member of Parliament (MP), lawyer and a colonel of cavalry during the English Civil War.

Gurdon was the son of Brampton Gurdon (died 1649), an MP and High Sheriff of Suffolk, by his second marriage. His father left him the Letton estate while passing the family's other estate (at Assington in Suffolk) to Brampton's older half-brother, John. Brampton qualified as a barrister, and in 1645 was elected a member of the Long Parliament, filling a vacancy at Sudbury, though he does not seem to have been an active member. During the Civil War he was colonel of a regiment of horse and served as a member of the court martial which condemned Sir Charles Lucas and Sir George Lisle to death after the Siege of Colchester.

He married Mary Polstead, and died in 1669. He was succeeded by his son, also called Brampton Gurdon (died 1691).

References
John Burke, A Genealogical and Heraldic History of the Commoners of Great Britain and Ireland (London: Henry Colburn, 1835)
D Brunton & D H Pennington, Members of the Long Parliament (London: George Allen & Unwin, 1954)

1606 births
1669 deaths
Roundheads
English MPs 1640–1648